Dockstader is a surname. Notable people with this surname include:

 Dan Dockstader (born 1958), American politician
 Lew Dockstader (1856–1924), American comedian
 Nicholas Dockstader (1802–1871), American businessman
 Tod Dockstader (1932–2015), American composer